The 2017 NASCAR Camping World Truck Series was the 23rd season of the third highest stock car racing series sanctioned by NASCAR in North America. The season began with the NextEra Energy Resources 250 at Daytona International Speedway on February 24, 2017, and ended with the Ford EcoBoost 200 at Homestead-Miami Speedway on November 17. Johnny Sauter entered the season as the defending drivers' champion. This was the final season for Brad Keselowski Racing and for Red Horse Racing.

Christopher Bell of Kyle Busch Motorsports won the driver's championship with a second-place finish in the season finale, Kyle Busch won the owner's championship for the fifth consecutive season, and Toyota won the manufacturer's championship.

This was the second year that the Truck Series (and the Xfinity Series) had a playoff system. Three of the four "championship 4" drivers (who are shown below), were the same as last year's; the only difference being Austin Cindric in it instead of Timothy Peters.

Teams and drivers

Complete schedule

Limited schedule

Notes

Changes

Drivers
NASCAR Next driver Noah Gragson will drive the No. 18 Toyota Tundra for Kyle Busch Motorsports in the 2017 season, replacing William Byron. Gragson competed in the 2016 NASCAR K&N Pro Series East and West where he finished 5th and 3rd, respectively, in the points standings and drove two races for Wauters Motorsports in 2016 at Phoenix and Homestead.
After having driven a partial schedule in 2016, Austin Cindric will drive full-time for Brad Keselowski Racing in 2017.
Kaz Grala is promoted to a full-time ride with GMS Racing to pilot the No. 33 Chevrolet, replacing Ben Kennedy. Grala competed the No. 33 and No. 24 trucks part-time last season with the same team.
2016 K&N Pro Series East champion Justin Haley will drive the No. 24 for GMS Racing, starting at Martinsville due to age restrictions. Scott Lagasse Jr. will drive the truck for Daytona and Alex Bowman will drive at Atlanta.
Kyle Busch along with young drivers Myatt Snider, Harrison Burton, and K&N West Champion Todd Gilliland will share the No. 51 Truck for 2017, replacing Cody Coughlin and Daniel Suarez. Gilliland competed in the K&N Pro Series West for Billy McAnally Racing where he secured his first championship in 2016. Burton competed in the K&N Pro Series East for HScott Motorsports with Justin Marks and drove one race for KBM in 2016 at Martinsville. Snider did one race for AM Racing at Martinsville in October.
Justin Fontaine will drive AM Racing's second truck part-time. Fontaine drove one race for the team in 2016 at Phoenix.
As a part of Ford Performance's driver development program, Chase Briscoe will drive for Brad Keselowski Racing in 2017. Briscoe won the 2016 ARCA Racing Series championship.
Spencer Boyd and Cody Ware will share driving duties for Rick Ware Racing in 2017. Jordan Anderson will drive the truck at Atlanta and Martinsville.
Joe Nemechek will return to the truck series part-time driving the No. 87 for his team NEMCO Motorsports.
After having driven a partial schedule for Kyle Busch Motorsports and Athenian Motorsports in 2016, Cody Coughlin will drive the No. 13 full-time for ThorSport Racing in 2017, replacing Cameron Hayley.
Grant Enfinger will drive a truck full-time for ThorSport Racing, replacing Rico Abreu. Enfinger drove a partial schedule for GMS Racing in 2016.
After driving full-time for Tommy Baldwin Racing in the 2016 NASCAR Sprint Cup Series Season, Regan Smith will return to the Truck Series driving the No. 92 RBR Enterprises Ford part-time in 12 races. Smith's last Truck start was in 2008, in the Cool City Customs 200 at the Michigan International Speedway.
Parker Kligerman will drive the No. 75 Truck for Henderson Motorsports, sharing driving duties with Caleb Holman. Kligerman drove the No. 92 RBR Enterprises Ford part-time last season.
J. J. Yeley returned to the Truck Series, driving the No. 22 AM Racing Toyota at the NextEra Energy Resources 250. Austin Wayne Self, who will drive for this team the rest of the season except at Atlanta where the team skipped the race, also will drive the No. 32 at the opener.
Wendell Chavous will attempt to run for the Rookie of the Year honors in the 2017 season. He will drive the No. 49 Chevrolet for Premium Motorsports. Chavous's last start was in 2015.
T. J. Bell returned to the Truck Series, driving part-time the No. 45 Chevrolet for Niece Motorsports starting at Daytona and 5 other races.
After running part-time for Red Horse Racing and scoring a win in the 2016 season, Brett Moffitt returned to the team, driving the No. 7 (renumbered from 11) for the first 5 races of the season before the team shutting down. 
Korbin Forrister will return to drive full-time in the 2017 season. He will be driving the No. 5 Toyota for Wauters Motorsports. However, the team withdrew before the spring Martinsville race for unknown reasons and have not run since.
Todd Peck drove the new No. 83 Chevy for the new Copp Motorsports team at Daytona, Atlanta, and Kansas. Donnie Levister drove the truck at Martinsville.
Terry Jones drove the No. 30 Ford for Rette Jones Racing at Daytona.
Victor Gonzalez Jr. drove the No. 45 Chevrolet for Niece Motorsports at Mosport Park.
Ted Minor returned to NASCAR after almost 3 years absence at Iowa driving for a new team: Long Motorsports.
Alex Tagliani drove the 02 for Young's Motorsports at Canadian Motorsports Park.
Cale Gale drove the 99 for MDM Motorsports at Martinsville Speedway.
Jeb Burton drove the 20 for Young's Motorsports at Martinsville Speedway. It was Burton's first truck start in almost two years.

Teams
JR Motorsports announced on January 3 that it would suspend its Truck Series team. Cole Custer drove the truck full-time in 2016. The team later sold six trucks and their No. 00 owners points to Halmar Friesen Racing.
Rick Ware Racing announced that it would return to the Truck Series full-time in 2017, having purchased the owners points of SS-Green Light Racing's No. 07 truck.
Athenian Motorsports announced on January 10 that it would cease operations due to the retirement of driver John Wes Townley.
Hattori Racing Enterprises expands from part-time to full-time with Ryan Truex returning to the team and renumbered from No. 81 to No. 16.
NEMCO Motorsports will expand to a two truck team with Joe Nemechek driving the No. 87 Chevrolet Silverado part-time in the first 3 races. After that, they sold their owner points to JJC Racing. The No. 87 returned at Gateway.
Martins Motorsports announced on February 9 a partnership with Brandonbilt Motorsports for the 2017 season. Brandon Brown will drive the No. 44 Chevrolet at 4 races. On April 14, it was announced that Martins Motorsports will shut down their Truck Series program to move on a part-time basis in Xfinity Series. They sold the owner points to Faith Motorsports. However, after 7 races Martins Motorsports returned.
After running full-time between the 2015 and 2016 seasons, GMS Racing's No. 23 Chevrolet will run part-time in 3 races. Spencer Gallagher at Daytona, Chase Elliott at Atlanta and Martinsville. Elliott won Martinsville race. After that, they switch the owner points with No. 24, so the No. 24 is locked for all races until the end of the season because is a race winner in the season and also will make the owners' championship playoffs. The former No. 24 owner points they sold to Norm Benning Racing.
Contreras Motorsports has sold their assets to Copp Motorsports who now runs the No. 83 Chevrolet.
MDM Motorsports will run the No. 99 Chevrolet full-time after running part-time in 2016. The team had purchased the owners points of Athenian Motorsports' No. 05 truck.
Red Horse Racing announced on May 22 that it would suspend operations effective immediately due to a lack of funding. The team had fielded two full-time trucks for Brett Moffitt and Timothy Peters.
Brad Keselowski Racing announced on August 17 that will shut down following the conclusion of the 2017 season.

Crew chiefs

Rule changes
On October 26, NASCAR announced that drivers with more than five years of full-time racing on the Cup level may drive a maximum of seven Camping World Truck Series races. They are also ineligible to drive in the final eight races of the season. Exceptions will be given to drivers with more than five years of full-time racing on the Cup level if they declared to run points in Truck Series.
On February 8, 2017, NASCAR announced a new damaged vehicle policy for all three national series. Body panels can no longer be replaced after a wreck, and a team has five minutes on pit road to fix the damage before they are eliminated.
As in the NASCAR Cup Series and NASCAR Xfinity Series, all Truck races will be split into segments. After the first two intermediate segment finishes, the top 10 drivers will be awarded points. The race finish will air full points as usual. The first two segments have about one quarter of the race laps each, and the final segment has about half of the race laps.

Schedule

The season's schedule comprises 23 races, and was released on May 5, 2016. Fox, FS1, and Fox Business will televise every race in the United States.

Results and standings

Race results

Drivers' standings

(key) Bold – Pole position awarded by time. Italics – Pole position set by final practice results or owner's points. * – Most laps led. 1 – Stage 1 winner. 2 – Stage 2 winner. 1-10 – Regular season top 10 finishers.
. – Eliminated after Round of 8
. – Eliminated after Round of 6

Owners' championship (Top 15)
(key) Bold – Pole position awarded by time. Italics – Pole position set by final practice results or rainout. * – Most laps led. 1 – Stage 1 winner. 2 – Stage 2 winner. 1-10 – Owners' regular season top 10 finishers.
. – Eliminated after Round of 8
. – Eliminated after Round of 6

Manufacturers' Championship

See also

2017 Monster Energy NASCAR Cup Series
2017 NASCAR Xfinity Series
2017 NASCAR K&N Pro Series East
2017 NASCAR K&N Pro Series West
2017 NASCAR Whelen Modified Tour
2017 NASCAR Pinty's Series
2017 NASCAR PEAK Mexico Series
2017 NASCAR Whelen Euro Series

Notes
 After a dominant win by Chase Elliott at Martinsville in a part-time team (No. 23), GMS Racing switched owner points from No. 24 and No. 23 for number 24 make the owners' playoffs.

References

Camping World Truck Series
2017